The Critics' Choice Television Award for Best Supporting Actor in a Comedy Series is one of the award categories presented annually by the Critics' Choice Television Awards (BTJA) to recognize the work done by television actors.

Winners and nominees

2010s

2020s

Multiple wins
2 wins
 Andre Braugher
 Henry Winkler

Multiple nominations
4 nominations
 Andre Braugher

3 nominations
 Tituss Burgess
 Ty Burrell
 Tony Hale
 Danny Pudi
 Henry Winkler

2 nominations
 Jaime Camil
 Max Greenfield
 Harvey Guillén 
 William Jackson Harper
 Sean Hayes
 Brandon Scott Jones
 Dan Levy
 T. J. Miller
 Ed O'Neill
 Nick Offerman
 Nico Santos

See also
 TCA Award for Individual Achievement in Comedy
 Primetime Emmy Award for Outstanding Supporting Actor in a Comedy Series
 Golden Globe Award for Best Supporting Actor – Series, Miniseries or Television Film

References

External links
 

Critics' Choice Television Awards
Television awards for Best Supporting Actor